Smle (stylized in lowercase) is an American electronic music duo consisting of Ruben Cardenas and Lewis Martinee. They are best known for their remix of Bobby Rush's song "Funk O'De Funk", for which they were nominated for the Best Remixed Recording award at the 60th Annual Grammy Awards.

Discography

Extended plays

Singles

Awards and nominations

Grammy Awards

|-
|2018
|"Funk O'De Funk" (Smle Remix)
|Best Remixed Recording
|

References

Future bass musicians
Monstercat artists
American electronic music groups
Electronic music duos
American DJs
American electronic musicians
Electronic dance music DJs
Musicians from Miami